Bolivar is an outer northern suburb of Adelaide, South Australia. It is located in the City of Salisbury.

History

The suburb was established in 1956, and was named after the General Bolivar Hotel. This hotel had been built by Walter Walpole, a settler who had arrived in South Australia in 1850 on the sailing ship Bolivar.

Bolivar Post Office in the then rural area opened on 1 July 1905 and closed in 1930.

Geography
Bolivar lies beside Barker Inlet and is bounded on the south by the Little Para River and on the east by Port Wakefield Road.

Demographics

The 2006 Census by the Australian Bureau of Statistics counted 119 persons in Bolivar on census night. Of these, 63.9% were male and 36.1% were female.

The majority of residents (69.7%) are of Australian birth, with an additional 13.4% claiming England as their country of birth.

The age distribution of Bolivar residents is skewed towards an older population compared to the greater Australian population: 94.1% of residents were over 25 years in 2006, compared to the Australian average of 66.5%.

Facilities and attractions

Waste water treatment plant
The suburb is best known as the location of the Bolivar Waste Water Treatment Plant. Bolivar is the largest of three SA Water sewage treatment plants in metropolitan Adelaide and the largest in South Australia. It produces recycled water which is provided to farmers on the Adelaide Plains near Virginia. Methane is collected and used to generate electricity. Bolivar produces 35,000 tonnes of biosolids which have been supplied to farmers since the 1960s. Bolivar processes 60% of metropolitan Adelaide's raw sewage. The biogas produced in the treatment process is used to generate 85% of the facility's annual electricity requirements. Twenty-five gigawatt-hours of electricity is generated by the natural gas-powered reciprocating engines each year. It treats 135 million litres of water per day. Water from the northwestern suburbs is treated separately as it tends to be more saline and not suitable for reuse in irrigation. Waste water that is not used for irrigation of market gardens or reticulation at Mawson Lakes is discharged via an open outfall channel 11 km long near St Kilda at the northern end of the Barker Inlet. Water to be reused passes through an additional Dissolved Air Flotation and Filtration (DAFF) plant commissioned in 1999, and Mawson Lakes reticulated water also receives additional chlorination. The High Salinity Waste Water Treatment Plant is on the Bolivar site, but otherwise a separate facility that replaced a facility at Port Adelaide in 2005. There is a dedicated pumped trunk sewer delivering the raw sewage from the former site to Bolivar. it is 17 km long with a diameter of 900mm.

Bolivar's treated wastewater contains pollutants that enter the Port River estuary. In 2018-19 the most significant pollutants discharged to the marine environment were (by mass): nitrogen (320 tonnes), phosphorus (81 tonnes), fluoride (26 tonnes), boron (19 tonnes), ammonia (12 tonnes) and zinc (2.2 tonnes).

Parks
The southern boundary of the suburb runs along the Little Para River and includes greenspace and a shared path along the river.

Transportation

Rail 
The Adelaide-Port Augusta railway line had a station named Bolivar, which was north of where the Northern Expressway now crosses the railway (and several kilometres from Bolivar). There is still a crossing loop in the vicinity.

Roads 
Bolivar is serviced by Port Wakefield Road, part of the National Highway, and the North–South Motorway, Adelaide's under construction major north–south road route.

Air 

Frederic Custance made Australia's first monoplane flight at Bolivar on 17 March 1910.

See also
List of Adelaide suburbs
Gulf St Vincent Important Bird Area

References

External links

Suburbs of Adelaide
Populated places established in 1956